Sanat Kumar Saha (born 1941) is a Bangladeshi educator, economist and Tagore exponent. He was awarded Ekushey Padak in 2015 by the Government of Bangladesh. He served as a professor of economics at the University of Rajshahi. He is a former member of the board of directors of Bangladesh Bank.

Education and career
Saha studied at the University of Rajshahi and London School of Economics. In 2006, he retired as a professor from the University of Rajshahi. He had served as a director of Bangladesh Bank from 2010.

Awards
 Rabindra Award (2015)
 Ekushey Padak (2015)
 Bangla Academy Literary Award (2012)
 "8th Prothom Alo Borsho Shera Boi 1417" (2012)

Works
 Kobita-Akobita Rabindranath

References

Living people
1941 births
University of Rajshahi alumni
Alumni of the London School of Economics
Bangladeshi economists
Bangladeshi Hindus
Academic staff of the University of Rajshahi
Recipients of Bangla Academy Award
Recipients of the Ekushey Padak